CBC News: Disclosure is a Canadian investigative journalism television program. It debuted on CBC Television on November 13, 2001 and ended on April 6, 2004.

The show's original hosts were Wendy Mesley and Diana Swain. After the show's first season, Mesley moved to Marketplace, and was succeeded by Mark Kelley and Gillian Findlay.

References

External links
 

2000s Canadian television news shows
2001 Canadian television series debuts
2004 Canadian television series endings
Canadian Screen Award-winning television shows
CBC News
CBC Television original programming
Gemini and Canadian Screen Award for Best Reality Series winners